The World Allround Speed Skating Championships for Men took place on 14 and 15 February 1981 in Oslo at the Bislett Stadion ice rink.

Title holder was the Netherlander Hilbert van der Duim.

Classification

  DQ = Disqualified
   * = Fell

Source:

References

World Allround Speed Skating Championships, 1981
1981 World Allround

Attribution
In Dutch